Ficken is a surname. Notable people with the surname include:
 Dieter Ficken, German U.S. soccer player
 Gene Ficken, Democratic politician
 Katherine Cutler Ficken, American architect
 Millicent S. Ficken, American ornithologist
 Sam Ficken, American football player

See also

 Fick